NGC 5986 is a globular cluster of stars in the southern constellation of Lupus, located at a distance of approximately  from the Sun. It was discovered by Scottish astronomer James Dunlop on May 10, 1826. John L. E. Dreyer described it as, "a remarkable object, a globular cluster, very bright, large, round, very gradually brighter middle, stars of 13th to 15th magnitude". Its prograde–retrograde orbit through the Milky Way galaxy is considered irregular and highly eccentric. It has a mean heliocentric radial velocity of +100 km/s.

This is relatively massive cluster has been poorly studied, at least as of 2017. The cluster has a higher metallicity – what astronomers term the abundance of elements with higher atomic number then helium – compared to most other objects of its type. It may have at least 4–5 different stellar populations with distinct elemental compositions, and there is evidence that it has lost ~60–80% of its original mass.

Further reading

References

External links
 
 

Globular clusters
Lupus (constellation)
5986